Events from the first millennium AD in Canada.

Events
 c. AD 175: Funeral offerings in graves at the Norton Mounds in Michigan are elaborate. Materials imported from great distances indicate vigorous trade.
 c. AD 500: The Thule people arrive in Alaska
 c. AD 550: In the Upper Mississippi and Great Lakes areas, Woodland peoples construct their burial mounds in the shape of birds or animals.
 c. AD 985-1014: Norsemen led by Leif Ericson, son of Erik the Red, set up outposts in North America like L'Anse aux Meadows  with encounters with the Inuit, Beothuks, and Micmacs.

Further reading

See also

List of North American settlements by year of foundation
History of Canada
Timeline of Canada history
List of years in Canada
Norse colonization of North America

References

0001